Anaqcheh Rural District is a rural district (dehestan) in the Central District of Ahvaz County, Khuzestan Province, Iran. At the 2006 census by the Statistical Center of Iran, its population was 22,692, in 4,198 families.  The rural district has 44 villages.

References 

Rural Districts of Khuzestan Province
Ahvaz County